Ellice is a surname, and may refer to:

 Alexander Ellice (fur trader) 1743–1805), Scottish merchant who made his fortune in the North American fur trade
 Alexander Ellice (politician) (1791–1853), British naval officer and Member of Parliament, son of Alexander Ellice
 Andrew Ellice, Welsh army officer and politician who sat in the House of Commons in 1654
 Edward Ellice (merchant) (1783–1863), British merchant and politician, son of Alexander Ellice
 Edward Ellice (MP for St Andrews) (1810–1880), Scottish Liberal Party politician, son of the above
 Edward Charles Ellice (1858–1934), British Liberal Party politician
 Katherine Ellice (1813–1864), British diarist and artist
 Robert Ellice (Royalist) (fl.1640), Welsh Royalist army officer of the First English Civil War
 Robert Ellice (1784–1856), British Army general, son of Alexander Ellice
 Russell Ellice (c. 1799–1873), Chairman of the East India Company and director of the British American Land Company, son of Alexander Ellice